Michael Stephenson (born 28 September 1980 in Tynemouth) is a rugby union footballer, who plays at Touch My Pitch Up. He previously played at Fullback for Percy Park RFC and formerly for England. Stephenson began his career with the Newcastle Falcons, winning two English Cups in 2001 and 2004 during five years in the Falcons' first team before moving to Bath in the Summer of 2005, Stephenson then joined Leeds Carnegie before signing for Percy Park RFC and Percy Park Sharks. He currently plays for Touch My Pitch Up, sometimes. They have reached the play-off finals four years running and were unbeaten in the season leading up to the 2017 play-offs.

Stephenson's rugby career was nurtured at Durham School where he reached two National Cup semi-finals and played at first team level for three years in a team which has produced other internationals such as Garath Archer.

He made his international debut against Canada in Markham on 2 June 2001.

References

External links
Leeds profile

1980 births
Living people
Bath Rugby players
England international rugby union players
English rugby union players
Leeds Tykes players
Newcastle Falcons players
People educated at Durham School
Rugby union players from Tynemouth
Rugby union fullbacks